This is a list of the speakers of the Parliament of the German-speaking Community of Belgium, the speakers of the Council of the German-speaking Community and the speakers of the Council of the German Cultural Community since 1973.

Sources

German-Speaking Community Parliament Speakers
Speakers
Speakers
Belgium, German-speaking Parliament
Belgium, German-speaking Parliament